The Fort de Shinkakasa, also called Fort Boma, was a fortification built in the Congo Free State to defend access to the Congo river in 1891.

The fort was designed in a two-sided arrow shape by the Belgian engineer Émile Wangermée who had studied fortress design under General Henri Alexis Brialmont. It was built by the Congo Free State to control access to the river, particularly against the Portuguese who occupied nearby Angola and Cabinda and which it was feared might cut off the Congo Free State from access to the Atlantic Ocean. In fact, the confrontation between the two nations were in fact limited to exchanges of fire between light batteries and Portuguese ships.

About two hundred soldiers of the Free State Force Publique occupied the fort where they manned the fort's eight  ship guns. In case of emergency, they were supported by local auxiliaries. The troops of various tribes were assembled there to prevent impending mutinies. They were principally from distant regions to counter any rebellion, such as the Batetela rebellion of 1885–87. Nonetheless, a major mutiny occurred among Tetela soldiers in the fort on 17 April 1900.

Bibliography
 Simon, Eric, Le Fort de Shinkakasa, Bulletin d'information du CLHAM (Centre liégeois d'histoire et d'archéologie militaires), vol X, no. 10, April–June 2009, ISSN 0771-3673

External links

Buildings and structures in the Democratic Republic of the Congo
+
Military history of the Democratic Republic of the Congo